Harold Holt was Prime Minister of Australia from 1966 to 1967.

Harold Holt may also refer to:

 Harold Holt (impresario) (1885–1953), British classical music impresario

Named after Prime Minister Harold Holt

 Division of Holt, an Australian Electoral Division in Victoria
 Harold Holt Memorial Swimming Centre in Glen Iris, Melbourne
 Holt, Australian Capital Territory, a suburb of Canberra
 Naval Communication Station Harold E. Holt, near Exmouth, Western Australia
 USS Harold E. Holt (FF-1074), a Knox-class frigate of the US Navy

Holt, Harold